John Peter Sesay (born 8 May 2003) is a Sierra Leonean footballer who plays as a midfielder for German club Rot-Weiß Koblenz, on loan from Darmstadt 98.

Career
Sesay was born in Freetown. After playing youth football for SV Niederursel, Rot-Weiss Frankfurt and Darmstadt 98, Sesay made his senior debut on 24 July 2021 as a substitute in a 2–0 2. Bundesliga defeat to Jahn Regensburg.

On 4 August 2022, Sesay joined Rot-Weiß Koblenz on loan.

References

External links

2003 births
Living people
Sierra Leonean footballers
Association football midfielders
Rot-Weiss Frankfurt players
SV Darmstadt 98 players
FC Rot-Weiß Koblenz players
2. Bundesliga players
Regionalliga players
Sierra Leonean expatriate footballers
Expatriate footballers in Germany
Sierra Leonean expatriate sportspeople in Germany